Alisa Kleybanova and Ekaterina Makarova were the defending champions, however they chose not to compete this year.
Iveta Benešová and Anabel Medina Garrigues won in the final 6–3, 6–1, against Lucie Hradecká and Renata Voráčová.

Seeds

Draw

Draw

References
 Doubles Draw

Morocco Open
Grand Prix SAR La Princesse Lalla Meryem - Doubles
2010 in Moroccan tennis